Bekim Erkoçeviç (born 23 April 1992) is an Albanian professional footballer who plays as a striker for German Bremen-Liga club Vatan Sport Bremen.

Club career

Early career
Erkoçeviç made his debut on the last day of the 2010–11 campaign away to Bylis Ballsh in a 2–0 loss, coming on as a substitute for Ndriçim Shtubina in the 62nd minute. He was an unused substitute in the Europa League against Birkirkara on 30 June 2011.

Erkoçeviç left the club on 12 August 2012 after struggling to find minutes to play as he concluded 2011–12 with only 14 league matches, only 4 of them as starter.

Apolonia Fier
On 10 January 2014, Erkoçeviç came at Apolonia Fier on a one-week trial. Ten days later, he successfully passed the trial and signed a contract with the club.

Besëlidhja Lezhë
On 17 January 2015, Erkoçeviç agreed personal terms and joined Besëlidhja Lezhë for an undisclosed fee.

Vllaznia Shkodër
In January 2016, Erkoçeviç returned to his first club Vllaznia Shkodër after impressing in a friendly against his former side Ada Velipojë. He made his return debut a month later on 27 February in the goalless draw against Laçi where he appeared in the last minutes as a substitute. He made another four appearances, all of them as substitutes, collecting 95 minutes as Vllaznia finished 6th in championship.

During the 2016–17 season, Erkoçeviç made no league appearances. He, however, contributed with 3 cup appearances, notably scoring a brace in the returning fixture of second round against Kamza.

In September 2017, Erkoçeviç was assigned to their B-team, which participated in the first division. He scored his first goal of the season on 18 November by netting the third in the 1–3 win over Erzeni Shijak. That was his only strike in 11 appearances for the team as he left in mid-January.

Besëlidhja Lezhë return
On 16 January 2018, Erkoceviç returned to Besëlidhja Lezhë and signed a contract running until 2019. On 30 June, after finishing the season with 11 appearances and no goals, the club gave him a contract for the next season. He began the new season on 9 September by playing in team's opening league match against Burreli, receiving a red card for violent conduct towards an opponent player. Shortly after, he was suspended for the next five matches by Disciplinary Commission of AFA.

Career statistics

References

External links

1992 births
Footballers from Shkodër
Living people
Albanian footballers
Association football forwards
KF Vllaznia Shkodër players
KS Ada Velipojë players
KS Burreli players
KF Apolonia Fier players
Besëlidhja Lezhë players
Kategoria Superiore players
Kategoria e Parë players
Landesliga players
Oberliga (football) players
Albanian expatriate footballers
Expatriate footballers in Germany
Albanian expatriate sportspeople in Germany